Turn This Mutha Out is a 1977 album by Idris Muhammad. Produced and arranged by CTI/Kudu staff arranger David Matthews, it was aimed more at the R&B/dance market than the jazz market. One of only a few Kudu albums not produced by label owner Creed Taylor himself, Turn This Mutha Out spawned two pop and R&B hits, the title track and "Could Heaven Ever Be Like This."

Track listing
 "Could Heaven Ever Be Like This" (David Matthews, Tony Sarafino) – 8:37
 "Camby Bolongo" (Matthews) – 3:50
 "Turn This Mutha Out" (Matthews, Sarafino) – 6:50
 "Tasty Cakes" (Matthews, Sarafino) – 4:23
 "Crab Apple" (Matthews) – 5:07
 "Moon Hymn" (Matthews) – 4:22
 "Say What" (Matthews) – 4:05

Track credits
1. Could Heaven Ever Be Like This
Idris Muhammad — drums, tom tom
 Wilbur Bascomb — bass
 Hiram Bullock	— guitar solo
 Charlie Brown	— guitar
 Rubens Bassini — percussion
 Sue Evans — percussion
 Michael Brecker	— tenor saxophone solo
 Ronnie Cuber — baritone saxophone
 David Tofani — soprano saxophone
 Clifford Carter — synthesizer solo
 Randy Brecker — trumpet
 Jon Faddis — trumpet
 Margaret Ross — harp
 Frank Floyd — vocal solo
 Bill Eaton — background vocals
 Zachary Sanders — background vocals
 Ray Simpson — background vocals

2. Camby Bolongo
 Idris Muhammad — drums, tom tom
 Wilbur Bascomb — bass
 Charlie Brown — guitar
 Hugh McCracken — guitar
 Sue Evans — percussion
 Randy Brecker — trumpet solo
 Jeremy Steig — flute solo

3. Turn This Mutha Out
 Idris Muhammad — drums, tom tom
 Wilbur Bascomb — bass
 Clifford Carter — keyboards
 Hiram Bullock — guitar solo
 Sue Evans — percussion
 Bill Eaton — background vocals
 Zachary Sanders — background vocals
 Ray Simpson — background vocals

4. Tasty Cakes
 Idris Muhammad — drums, tom tom
 Wilbur Bascomb — bass
 Clifford Carter — keyboards
 Hiram Bullock — guitar solo
 Sue Evans — percussion
 Bill Eaton — background vocals
 Zachary Sanders — background vocals
 Ray Simpson — background vocals

5. Crab Apple
 Idris Muhammad — drums, tom tom
 Wilbur Bascomb — bass
 Charlie Brown — guitar
 Hiram Bullock — guitar solo
 Sue Evans — percussion
 Ronnie Cuber — baritone saxophone
 David Tofani — soprano saxophone
 Clifford Carter — synthesizer solo
 Michael Brecker	— tenor saxophone solo

6. Moon Hymn
 Idris Muhammad — drums, tom tom
 Wilbur Bascomb —bass
 Charlie Brown —guitar
 Sue Evans —percussion
 Ronnie Cuber —baritone saxophone
 David Tofani —soprano saxophone
 Clifford Carter — synthesizer

7. Say What
 Idris Muhammad — drums, tom tom
 Wilbur Bascomb — bass
 Charlie Brown — guitar
 Hugh McCracken — guitar
 Eric Gale — guitar solo
 Jeremy Steig — flute solo

Later Samples
"Crab Apple"
"Crooked Ass Nigga" by 2Pac from the album 2Pacalypse Now
"Say What"
"Dr. Knockboots" by Nas from the album I Am...
"Could Heaven Ever Be Like This"
"Rise (Bini & Martini Mix)" by Soul Providers
"Loud Places" by Jamie xx feat. Romy
"Marijuana" by Chrome Sparks
"Terrorise The City" by Klashnekoff ft Kool G Rap and Kyza 
"Alright" by Jamiroquai

References

 http://www.windowsmedia.com/MediaGuide/Templates/AlbumInfo.aspx?a_id=R%20%20%20%2067520
 http://sudo.3.pro.tok2.com/Quest/cards/I/IdrisMuhammad/TurnThisMuthaOut_x.html

1977 albums
CTI Records albums
Albums arranged by David Matthews (keyboardist)
Idris Muhammad albums